A partial solar eclipse occurred on December 2, 1956. A solar eclipse occurs when the Moon passes between Earth and the Sun, thereby totally or partly obscuring the image of the Sun for a viewer on Earth. A partial solar eclipse occurs in the polar regions of the Earth when the center of the Moon's shadow misses the Earth.

Related eclipses

Solar eclipses of 1953–1956

References

1956 12 2
1956 in science
1956 12 2
December 1956 events